Granulifusus balbus is a species of sea snail, a marine gastropod mollusk in the family Fasciolariidae, the spindle snails, the tulip snails and their allies.

Description
The length of the shell attains 28.2 mm.

Distribution
This marine species occurs off New Caledonia. It has been recorded on the continental slope at depths of 30m to 200m, but also has been recorded at 550m.

References

balbus
Gastropods described in 2005